The Wheelbarrow Olympics (in Hungarian Talicskaolimpia) is an international sports event organized annually in Hosszúhetény village in Baranya county, Hungary. The participants compete individually and in teams, in several categories: solo, double, triple, sandwich and in speed and skill exercises.

Foreign participants of the games have been from Croatia, Denmark, Germany, Italy, Romania, Serbia, Slovakia and South Korea. The games are linked with cultural programmes including concerts and dance performances. The side events are Rocktalicska with the concerts of young rock bands and Folktalicska, with folk music and dance performances.

The XV. Wheelbarrow Olympics was held on 11–13 June 2015.

Notes

External links
Wheelbarrow Olympics video
Doubles at the 2011 Games
Girls in the wheelbarrow, 2011
Artist Genadie Popescu on the first wheelbarrow olympics sculpture in the world, exhibited at the 2011 Games
A XI. Hetényi Talicskaolimpia on Facebook
Website (part English, part Hungarian)

Baranya County
Sport in Hungary
Novelty running